Norman John Cole (1 June 1909 – 22 January 1979) was a British Conservative and National Liberal Member of Parliament.  He represented South Bedfordshire from 1951 to 1966, when the seat was taken by Labour candidate Gwilym Roberts.

Political career 
During his time as an MP Cole introduced a private members bill which eventually culminated in the Child and Young Persons (Amendment) Act 1952.

References

External links 
 

1909 births
1979 deaths
Conservative Party (UK) MPs for English constituencies
UK MPs 1951–1955
UK MPs 1955–1959
UK MPs 1959–1964
UK MPs 1964–1966